The Vietnam Football Federation Vietnam International Friendly Cup or VFF Vietnam International Friendly Cup is an annual football tournament organised in Vietnam. Every year the tournament is held at the Mỹ Đình National Stadium in Hanoi with other foreign participants are either club teams or national teams, while the host remain to use their own national team.

History 
It was played from 19 August 2004 until 2011 and known firstly as Agribank Cup as a replacement to the Vietnam Independence Cup. In 2008, it was renamed due to the withdrawal of the Vietnam Bank for Agriculture and Rural Development (Agribank) as the main sponsor. In 2012, Vietnam Football Federation (VFF) announced that the competition would no longer be played. It was then revived again in 2018 as Vinaphone Cup following the new sponsorship from Vietnam Posts and Telecommunications Group (VNPT).

The 2021 edition was cancelled due to COVID-19 pandemic in Vietnam

Summary

Edition details

2004 Results 
For the first edition of the Agribank Cup Vietnam hosted the Porto Reserve team from Portugal, Santa Cruz F.C. from Brazil and the Thailand XI selection team, consisting of players from the Thailand Premier League. For this tournament the Football Association of Thailand (FAT) refused to send one of its national teams to take part, instead they sent a 'Selection Team' after the VFF insisted on Thailand's participation.
The tournament lasted four days from 22 to 26 September 2004. The guest team from Portugal won the Agribank Cup after three consecutive victories and was awarded $30,000, host nation Vietnam was awarded $20,000 finishing as runners up and Santa Cruz pocketed $5,000 finishing third.

2005 Results 
For the second tournament host nation Vietnam entered its Olympic team to compete against Olympic teams from, Malaysia and Thailand. As well as Japan's U-20 team. The tournament lasted from 26 to 30 October 2005. Following three consecutive victories Vietnam's team clinched the Agribank Cup with $40,000 in prize money, while Thailand and Japan took home $20,000 each after finishing second and third place respectively.

2006 Results 
The third edition of the Agribank Cup lasted from 25 to 29 October 2006. The VFF initially invited teams from Bahrain, Iceland and Thailand to participate in the tournament, but due to Iceland's withdrawal a team from New Zealand was invited to fill the void instead.

For this tournament host nation Vietnam and Thailand both entered a near full-strength team, New Zealand sent the B-team called New Zealand "A", while Bahrain used their under-21 squad.

2007 Results 
From 1 to 5 November 2007, Olympic teams from Finland, Uzbekistan and Zimbabwe were invited to compete against host nation Vietnam in the tournament. The tournament winner was awarded US$40,000 in prize money, US$20,000 for the runners-up and US$10,000 for the third-place team.

Thailand withdrew from the tournament to focus on the 2010 World Cup qualifiers. To fill the void the VFF invited Zimbabwe to replace Thailand.

2008 Results 
In 2008, the tournament was renamed as the T&T Cup due to changes in sponsorship. The tournament lasted from 28 October to 1 November 2008. Initially Vietnam invited national teams from North Korea, Thailand and Uzbekistan to participate in this football tournament. On 26 October the Uzbekistan Football Federation (UFF) informed tournament organisers that they won't be attending the tournament, after sending a list of twenty-five players, so only three national teams competed for this year's T&T Cup. On 1 November, the match between host nation Vietnam and Thailand was postponed due to heavy rain. The match resumed on 16 November 2008, with Thailand winning the tournament following a 2–2 draw with Vietnam.

2009 Results 
For the sixth edition of this tournament, the VFF agreed to a sponsorship deal with Smart Door. Hence the 2009 competition was known as the VFF Smart Door Cup. The tournament lasted from 5 to 9 November 2009. Olympic teams from China, Singapore and Thailand were the main competitors in the tournament, against host nation Vietnam. For this edition of the tournament, Vietnam's squad won the VFF Cup for the second time following their 3–1 victory over China.

2010 Results 
The 2010 VFF Cup will be mainly sponsored by Son Ha Company to develop football in Vietnam. As of that, this year's competition was named the VFF SonHa Cup. Vietnam Football Federation had invited the national teams of Korea DPR, Singapore, and a South Korean University Selection Team. These team will be competing against the host nation team Vietnam. For this edition of the tournament, Korea DPR squad won the VFF Cup for the first time following their 2–0 victory over Vietnam. Singapore finished second and the South Korean University Selection Team was third.

2011 Results 

The 2011 edition of the tournament was known as the VFF-Eximbank Cup. Host nation Vietnam was represented by the Olympic team, as they were preparing for the upcoming 2011 Southeast Asian Games in Indonesia. Olympic teams from Malaysia, Myanmar and Uzbekistan were invited to take part in the tournament. On 23 October 2011, the tournament concluded with Uzbekistan winning the tournament for the second time, whereas host nation Vietnam finished as runners-up. The champions were rewarded with $25,000 in prize money, the second-placed team received $10,000 and the third-placed team was rewarded $5,000.

2012 Results 

The 2012 edition was initially set to be played between hosts Vietnam, Turkmenistan, North Korea and Iran U-22. Iran and North Korea were replaced by Laos and South Korea University Selection on 10 October. The South Korean team is a selection from the University League, but it doesn't include players from the top 32 universities due to a collision with the 2012 University League Championship schedules. Laos themselves replaced the Maldives who initially looked like taking part as replacements for Iran.

2018 Results 

VFF invited the Olympic teams from Oman, Uzbekistan and Barcelona B to join the tournament. Barcelona B declined as they could not collect their best squad. Australia was then called to replace Barcelona B, but they decided to send the U-19 team as their U-23 team needed to play for clubs in FFA Cup. VFF disagreed with the Australian decision since they only wanted a U-23 or Olympic team joining the tournament. Finally, VFF contacted the Palestinian Football Association with the Palestinian agreed to send their Olympic squad to compete.

2021 Cancellation 
VFF invited the Olympic teams from Oman, Japan and Bahrain to join the tournament. But they decided to send the U-19 team as their U-23 team needed to play for clubs in FFA Cup. However, season was cancelled due to COVID-19 pandemic.

2022 Results

Singapore and India were invited for participation with the host Vietnam. On 16th August 2022, All India Football Federation (AIFF) was suspended by FIFA due to undue influence from third parties, which constitutes a serious violation of the FIFA Statutes; however, this ban was lifted on 27th August and India can finally compete. Vietnam national team had its first-time ever lifting the VFF Cup trophy by winning all two matches of the tournament.

Controversy 
Ever since the inauguration of the Agribank football tournament in 2004 there has always been controversies surrounding the organisation of the tournament. The most recurring issue is the lack of quality teams partaking in the tournament; for the first edition of the tournament Thailand sent a 'selection team' consisted of local league players unknown to Vietnamese fans, instead of the national team as requested by the VFF.

Japan and Bahrain both entered their youth teams in the 2005 and 2006 tournaments respectively, and on each occasion the invited teams lacked the quality that was demanded by the organisers. Due to the expressed disappointments of their Vietnamese organisers in 2006, the Bahrain Football Association (BFA) sent a letter stating their reasons for not sending a full-strength team to the tournament. For the 2007 edition of the Agribank Cup, Thailand once again declined an invitation to take part thus Zimbabwe was invited to fill the gap left by Thailand.

Due to the combination of factors, such as the lack of quality teams and the deficiencies of the VFF as the tournament organiser, Agribank announced that it would stop sponsoring the tournament in 2008.

References

External links 
 

 
International association football competitions hosted by Vietnam
Recurring sporting events established in 2004
2000s establishments in Vietnam
International men's association football invitational tournaments